Nathan Thornton (born July 13, 1988 in Arlington, Texas) is an American soccer player who currently plays for Charlotte Eagles in the USL Professional Division.

References

External links
 USL Pro bio 

1988 births
Living people
American soccer players
Clemson Tigers men's soccer players
Charlotte Eagles players
Soccer players from Texas
USL Championship players
Association football midfielders